A fin de fiesta is a short theatrical piece in the Spanish Golden Age (Siglo de Oro) tradition performed after the comedia in order to send the audience home in a festive mood. This was first performed in 1798.

References

History of theatre
Theatrical genres
Spanish Golden Age literary genres